Li Jing (born 1978) is a Chinese comedian and xiangsheng actor. He, along with Guo Degang and Zhang Wenshun, founded the popular xiangsheng group Deyunshe. He has also appeared in many films.

Filmography
 Mr. & Mrs. Incredible (2011)
 House Mania (2011)
 A Chinese Ghost Story (2011)
 Just Try Me (2012)
 Drug War (2013)
 The Monkey King (2014)
 Lock Me Up, Tie Him Down (2014)
 Stealing Legend (2014)
 The House That Never Dies (2014)
 Night of Adventure (2014)
 Break (2014)
 Emperor's Holidays (2015)
 Love Without Distance (2015)
 The Road (2015)
 Devil's Vendetta (2019)
 Devil's Vendetta 2 (2019)

References

Chinese male stage actors
Chinese male film actors
1978 births
Living people
21st-century Chinese male actors
Place of birth missing (living people)
Chinese male comedians